The Iowa District East is one of the 35 districts of the Lutheran Church–Missouri Synod (LCMS), and covers the eastern half of the state of Iowa; the rest of the state forms the Iowa District West. The Iowa District East includes approximately 119 congregations and missions, subdivided into 12 circuits, as well as 32 preschools,  9 elementary schools and 1 high school. Baptized membership in district congregations is over 40,000.

The Iowa District East was formed in 1936 when the Iowa District (created in 1879) was divided in half. District offices are located in Marion, Iowa. Delegates from each congregation meet in convention every three years to elect the district president, vice presidents, circuit counselors, a board of directors, and other officers. The Rev. Brian S. Saunders was elected district president in June 2009.

Presidents
Rev. Herman A. Harms, 1936–38
Rev. Carl J. H. Heffe, 1938–49
Rev. Walter D. Oetting, 1949–63
Rev. Fred H. Ilten, 1963–70
Rev. John C. Zimmermann, 1970–82
Rev. Alvin L. Barry, 1982–92
Rev. Curtis R. Moermond, 1992–2000
Rev. Gary M. Arp, 2000–2009
Rev. Brian S. Saunders, 2009–Present

References

External links
Iowa District East web site
LCMS: Iowa District East
LCMS Congregation Directory

Lutheran Church–Missouri Synod districts
Protestantism in Iowa
Christian organizations established in 1936